Goldthorpe United F.C. was an English association football club based in Goldthorpe, South Yorkshire.

History
Little is known of the club other than that it competed in the FA Cup in the 1920s and 1930s.

League and cup history

Records
Best FA Cup performance: 3rd Qualifying Round, 1930–31

References

Defunct football clubs in South Yorkshire
Defunct football clubs in England
Sheffield Association League